The NCAA Division I Football Championship Subdivision (FCS), formerly known as Division I-AA, is the second-highest level of college football in the United States, after the Football Bowl Subdivision. Sponsored by the National Collegiate Athletic Association (NCAA), the FCS level comprises 130 teams in 15 conferences as of the 2022 season.  The FCS designation is only tied to football with the non-football sports programs of each school generally competing in NCAA Division I.

History

From 1906 to 1955, the NCAA had no divisional structure for member schools. Prior to the 1956 college football season, schools were organized into an upper NCAA University Division and lower NCAA College Division. From 1973 to 1977, all schools participated in a single NCAA Division I group. Prior to the 1978 season, schools were again organized into upper NCAA Division I-A and lower NCAA Division I-AA groupings. These two divisions were renamed as NCAA Division I FBS and NCAA Division I FCS prior to the 2006 season.

Championships

The FCS has held a post-season playoff to award an NCAA-sanctioned national championship since its inception in 1978.  The size of the playoff bracket has increased from 4 teams in 1978 to 24 teams in the 2020 season.  This makes the FCS the highest level of college football with an NCAA-sanctioned national championship.

See also
 List of NCAA Division I FCS football programs
 List of NCAA Division I FCS football stadiums
 List of NCAA Division I FCS playoff appearances by team
 List of NCAA Division I-AA/FCS football seasons
 NCAA Division I FBS

References

External links